Bosta may refer to:
Bosta (film), a 2005 Lebanese film
 British Orthodontic Society Technicians Award
 Bosta, Hungary
Bosta, Bangladesh
Bostadh, Great Bernera, Outer Hebrides, Scotland